The Martini International was a men's professional golf tournament that was held from 1961 to 1983. It was hosted by several different golf clubs in England, Scotland and Wales. It was part of the British PGA tournament circuit, which evolved into the European Tour, and as such is recognised as an official European Tour event from 1972.

The winners included the major champions Peter Thomson, Greg Norman, Nick Faldo and Seve Ballesteros. In 1983 the prize fund was £80,308, which was mid-range for a European Tour event at the time. The tournament was sponsored by beverage company Martini & Rossi.

The 1971 Martini International saw a rare event, when John Hudson scored two successive holes-in-one during his second round at the Royal Norwich Golf Club. Hudson had taken 6 at the par-4 10th hole and then holed out at the 11th and 12th holes. He holed a 4-iron at the 195-yard 11th and then, using a driver, holed out at the downhill 311-yard 12th, making a rare par-4 albatross. Hudson scored 72 for his round, level par, to add to his first round 72. He finished on 287, 5 strokes behind the winner, in a tie for 9th place.

Winners

Notes

References

External links
Coverage on the European Tour's official site

Former European Tour events
Golf tournaments in the United Kingdom
Recurring sporting events established in 1961
Recurring events disestablished in 1983
1961 establishments in the United Kingdom
1983 disestablishments in the United Kingdom
Defunct sports competitions in the United Kingdom